"Out of the Blue" is the third single by American singer-songwriter-actress Debbie Gibson. The title track of her debut album, the song was written by Gibson and co-produced and co-arranged with Fred Zarr, with Douglas Breitbart as executive producer. Released as a single in January 1988, "Out of the Blue" gave Gibson her highest chart placing at the time by reaching No. 3 in the U.S. In the UK, it did slightly less well than her two previous singles, stalling at No. 19.

Cash Box called it a "catchy, hooky hit from one of the most exciting young (sweet sixteen} performers of pop music" that "is filled with the 'ear candy' that marks a great commercial record"

As a maxi single, "Out of the Blue," like "Shake Your Love" before it, took No. 1 on the Billboard Hot Maxi Singles chart.

In 2010, Gibson re-recorded the song as an extra track for the Deluxe Edition release of the Japan-exclusive album Ms. Vocalist.

In 2022, the song was featured in episode 2 of HBO's The Staircase.

Track listing

Versions
Out of the Blue [Album Version] 3:51
Out of the Blue [Video Version] 3:51
Out of the Blue [Dub Edit] 4:09
Out of the Blue [Vocal Club Mix] 5:50
Out of the Blue [Bonus Beats] 4:20
Out of the Blue [Radio Edit] 3:52
Out of the Blue [Vocal Drumapella] 4:05
Out of the Blue [Dub Version] 3:54

Weekly charts

Year-end charts

References

External links
 

1988 singles
1987 songs
Debbie Gibson songs
Song recordings produced by Fred Zarr
Songs written by Debbie Gibson
Atlantic Records singles